Joseph Meek (31 May 1910 – 1976) was an English professional footballer who played for Newcastle Co-op, Seaton Delaval, Stockton, Middlesbrough, Gateshead, Bradford Park Avenue, Tottenham Hotspur and Swansea Town.

Football career 
Meek played non-League football for Newcastle Co–op and Seaton Delaval before having an unsuccessful trial at Liverpool in 1927. Meek, an inside right, had spells at Stockton and Middlesbrough. In 1930 he joined Gateshead where he featured in 135 matches and netted 50 goals. After playing for Bradford Park Avenue, Meek signed for Tottenham Hotspur. Between 1935 and 1938 he played a total 51 matches and scored on 16 occasions in all competitions for the Spurs. Meek ended his career at Swansea Town.

References 

1910 births
1976 deaths
People from Newcastle upon Tyne (district)
Footballers from Tyne and Wear
English footballers
Seaton Delaval F.C. players
Stockton F.C. players
Middlesbrough F.C. players
Gateshead F.C. players
Bradford (Park Avenue) A.F.C. players
Tottenham Hotspur F.C. players
Swansea City A.F.C. players
English Football League players
Association football inside forwards